Augusta Lake is a lake in Dakota County, in the U.S. state of Minnesota.

Augusta Lake was named for a daughter of Henry Hastings Sibley.

See also
List of lakes in Minnesota

References

Lakes of Minnesota
Lakes of Dakota County, Minnesota